Chetin Husein Kazak (born 29 July 1972 in Targovishte) is a Bulgarian politician of Turkish descent and Member of the European Parliament (MEP). He is a member of the Movement for Rights and Freedoms, part of the Alliance of Liberals and Democrats for Europe, and became an MEP on 1 January 2007 with the accession of Bulgaria to the European Union. Kazak is of Turkish ethnic origin.

External links
 European Parliament profile
 European Parliament official photo

1972 births
Living people
Bulgarian Muslims
Bulgarian people of Turkish descent
People from Targovishte
Movement for Rights and Freedoms MEPs
MEPs for Bulgaria 2007